Pundarika Prathanmitr (born 13 November 1990) is a Thai woman cricketer and a footballer. She made her international debut for Thailand in the 2013 ICC Women's World Twenty20 Qualifier.

She was also a member of the national cricket team at the 2010 Asian Games and 2014 Asian Games.

References

External links 
 
 Profile at CricHQ

1990 births
Living people
Pundarika Prathanmitr
Cricketers at the 2010 Asian Games
Cricketers at the 2014 Asian Games
Pundarika Prathanmitr